Belle Vale is a Liverpool City Council ward in the Garston and Halewood Parliamentary constituency. The population of the ward at the 2011 census was 15,004. It was formed for the 2004 municipal elections from the former Valley and Netherley wards.

In 2016 Councillor Janet Kent retired and two seats were contested.

Councillors

 indicates seat up for re-election after boundary changes.

 indicates seat up for re-election.

 indicates change in affiliation.

 indicates seat up for re-election after casual vacancy.

Election results

Elections of the 2020s

Elections of the 2010s

Elections of the 2000s

After the boundary change of 2004 the whole of Liverpool City Council faced election. Three Councillors were returned at this election.

• italics denotes the sitting councillor
• bold denotes the winning candidate

References

External links
 Liverpool City Council: Ward Profile

Wards of Liverpool